CIC U Nantes Atlantique is a French UCI Continental road cycling team established in 1909. Until 2022, it was a national first-division (DN1) club team, but upgraded to UCI Continental status for the 2022 season.

Team roster

References

External links

UCI Continental Teams (Europe)
Cycling teams established in 1909
1909 establishments in France
Cycling teams based in France